The Dora Mavor Moore Award for Outstanding Production of a Musical is an annual award celebrating achievements in live Canadian theatre.

Awards and nominations

1990s

2000s

2010s

2020s

References

External links
 Toronto Alliance for the Performing Arts - Doras

Dora Mavor Moore Awards
Musical theatre awards